Tabaroa caatingicola is a species of legume found in the Caatinga of Bahia state, Brazil. It is the only member of the genus Tabaroa.

References 

Brongniartieae
Monotypic Fabaceae genera
Flora of Bahia